Robert Billingsley "Bob" Davis (September 26, 1921 – November 16, 1998) was an American football end and defensive end who played for six seasons with the Pittsburgh Steelers of the National Football League. He played college football at Penn State University for the Penn State Nittany Lions football team.

References

External links

1921 births
1998 deaths
Players of American football from Pennsylvania
Pittsburgh Steelers players
American football ends
American football defensive ends
Penn State Nittany Lions football players
People from Monongahela, Pennsylvania